Hampton Hill United Reformed Church,  in the London Borough of Richmond upon Thames, is a United Reformed Church congregation. Located on 35 High Street, Hampton Hill, opposite one of the gates to Bushy Park, it is a member of Churches Together Around Hampton. Its minister is Stephen Lewis.

References

United Reformed churches in the London Borough of Richmond upon Thames
History of the London Borough of Richmond upon Thames